Chinese autonomous administrative divisions are associated with one or more ethnic minorities that are designated as autonomous within the People's Republic of China. These areas are recognized in the Constitution of the People's Republic of China and are nominally given a number of rights not accorded to other administrative divisions of China. For example, Tibetan minorities in autonomous regions are granted rights and support not given to the Han Chinese, such as fiscal and medical subsidies.

Autonomous administrative divisions 
The PRC's autonomous administrative divisions may be found in the first (or top) to third levels of its national administrative divisions thus:

Ethnic area
Although not named as autonomous areas, some third-level settlements and areas that are identified as county-level cities and county-level districts enjoy the same autonomy as autonomous areas. At the fourth ("township") level, 1 ethnic sum (the Evenk Ethnic Sum) and over 270 ethnic townships also exist, but are not considered to be autonomous and do not enjoy the laws pertaining to the larger ethnic autonomous areas.

As these autonomous areas were created by the PRC, they are not recognised by the Republic of China on Taiwan which ruled Mainland China before the PRC's creation. However, in 2001, the ROC designated the Taiwanese indigenous areas in southern parts of the island.

Nomenclature 
The names of most of the PRC's autonomous areas are made from linking together:
 the name of a geographical area;
 the name or names of the predominant ethnic minority or minorities;
 the word "autonomous"; and
 a type of administrative division.
For instance:

In the Chinese name of the administrative area, the nationality name always includes the suffix "" ("nationality"), unless the nationality name consists of more than two syllables (e.g. Xinjiang Uyghur/Wéiwú'ěr AR) or the geographical name contains the nationality name (e.g. Inner Mongolia and Tibet ARs). This distinction is not reflected in translation into English.

Some autonomous areas have more than one specified minority, which tend to be listed in the name of the prefecture, creating rather long names. Two autonomous counties simply use "various nationalities" in their names as placeholders, rather than listing out all of their designated ethnicities:

A few autonomous areas break the regular nomenclature pattern, because the name of the nationality is already contained within the geographical name, or because there is no geographical name:

Legal basis 

Autonomous regions, prefectures, counties, and banners are covered under Section 6 of Chapter 3 (Articles 111–122) of the Constitution of the People's Republic of China, and with more detail under the Law of the People's Republic of China on Regional National Autonomy. The constitution states that the head of government of each autonomous areas must be of the ethnic group as specified by the autonomous area (such as Tibetan or Uyghur). The constitution also guarantees a range of rights including: independence of finance, independence of economic planning, independence of arts, science and culture, organization of local police, and use of local language. In addition, the head of government of each autonomous region is known as a "chairman", unlike provinces, where they are known as "governors".

Demographics 
Of the five autonomous regions, only Tibet has an absolute majority (>50%) of the designated ethnic group, since Tibetans make up 90% of the population as of 2011. Xinjiang is more ethnically diverse, with the titular Uyghurs making up a plurality at 46%, Han making up 39%, and various other ethnic groups making up the remaining 15% as of 2015. The remaining three autonomous regions have absolute majorities of Han people, the most populous ethnic group in China.

History 
Autonomous regions, prefectures, counties, and banners were established after communist takeover, following Soviet practice. At first, the nomenclature of these autonomous areas were somewhat confused, with autonomous regions appearing at the province, prefecture, county, and township levels. Eventually the nomenclature was standardized to the conventions used today.

The first autonomous region to be established was Inner Mongolia, created within communist-held territory in 1947, two years before the establishment of the People's Republic. Xinjiang was converted from a province to an autonomous region in 1955. Guangxi and Ningxia followed in 1958, and the Tibet Autonomous Region was formally established in 1965.

References 

 

bg:Автономни региони в КНР